Sandymoor Ormiston Academy is a coeducational secondary school and sixth form located in the Parish of Sandymoor, Runcorn, Cheshire, England. The school originally opened as Sandymoor School, a free school, in September 2012 in temporary premises, and relocated to a new permanent home in 2014.

In December 2019, the school joined Ormiston Academies Trust and was renamed Sandymoor Ormiston Academy. The Principal, appointed in 2019, is Mrs Sally Jones.

References

Secondary schools in the Borough of Halton
Free schools in England
Educational institutions established in 2012
2012 establishments in England
Runcorn
Ormiston Academies